Loo is a microdistrict of Lazarevsky City District of the city of Sochi, Krasnodar Krai, Russia,  located  from the city center.  Loo railway station is one of the stations on the North Caucasus Railway, subsidiary of Russian Railways and can be reached by the M27 highway.

History
The name "Loo" derives from the name of one of the greatest Abazin feudal families, Lau or Loo. Until 1864, Ubykhs from the Vardane community lived in the Loo river valley. On the sea coast was the aul of Ismail Barakai Dzepsh, one of the Ubykh leaders during the Caucasian War. Since 1872, the Loo river basin is the property of Vardane.

The northern wall of the temple, being built from limestone blocks, was preserved better than the remaining parts. According to the setting of the temple, it is similar to the temples of Pitsunda and Lykhny in Abkhazia / Georgia.

On August 7, 2008, a terrorist attack occurred on the beach of Loo, killing two people and injuring fifteen. Eight people were hospitalized.  The unidentified exploding device went off on the city beach at 10:10 Moscow Time. One of the people that died was a female resident of Kyiv born in 1986, the other was a male resident of Rostov-on-Don born in 1977.

Leisure in Loo
In recent years, a large number of private hotels and cottages appeared in Loo. The level of service in these facilities is constantly increasing. The recreation center "Akvaloo" achieved wide popularity with its developed infrastructure which includes a water park, restaurants, and a nightclub. The night club "Tornado" also is situated not far from the beach.

Sochi
Lazarevsky City District
Seaside resorts in Russia